Islamic Republic of Iran Mine Action Center was formed by Ministry of Defense and Armed Forces Logistics (Iran) in 2003 for mine clearance .

See also
Iraq-Iran War

References

Mine warfare and mine clearance organizations